Siatlai  is a village in Saiha district of Mizoram state of India.

References

Villages in Saiha district